Loch Ruel or Loch Riddon; extends north from the Kyles of Bute and is a sea loch in Argyll and Bute, Scotland.

References

External links

 Gaelic place names of Scotland

Ruel
Ruel
Cowal